I'm Still Waiting may refer to:

 "I'm Still Waiting" (Jodeci song), 1991 
 "I'm Still Waiting" (Curtis Mayfield song), 1966
 "I'm Still Waiting" (Diana Ross song), 1971
 "I'm Still Waitin'", 1998 song by Sasha

See also
 Still Waiting (disambiguation)